VQA is a three-letter acronym that may refer to:

 Vintners Quality Alliance, a regulatory system for Canadian wines
 .VQA, or Vector Quantized Animation, a file format for video encoding